Posovolone (developmental code name Co 134444) is a synthetic neurosteroid which was under development as a sedative/hypnotic medication for the treatment of insomnia.
 It is orally active and acts as a GABAA receptor positive allosteric modulator. In animals, posovolone shows anticonvulsant, anxiolytic-like, ataxic, and sleep-promoting effects and appeared to produce effects similar to those of pregnanolone. Development of the agent was started by 1999 and appears to have been discontinued by 2007. Posovolone was originally developed by Purdue Pharma.

See also
 List of investigational antidepressants
 List of investigational sleep drugs
 List of neurosteroids

References

External links
 CO 134444 - AdisInsight

5α-Pregnanes
Sterols
Anticonvulsants
Antidepressants
Anxiolytics
Experimental drugs
GABAA receptor positive allosteric modulators
Hypnotics
Imidazoles
Ketones
Neurosteroids
Pregnanes
Sedatives